Ek Second ... Jo Zindagi Badal De ...  is a 2010 Bollywood drama film, directed by Partho Ghosh featuring veteran Bollywood actors Jackie Shroff and Manisha Koirala in lead roles. The film also stars Pakistani actor, Moammar Rana, Nikita Anand and Rozza Catalona. This film is inspired from 1998 British-American romantic comedy-drama film Sliding Doors.

Plot
There is a proverb which says that whatever is written in one's destiny in some way or the other actually happens. But if we fight against it, and make the incident happen in a different way- then what? This film follows Rashi (Manisha Koirala) A woman who doesn't know what her destiny has written for her. One day she gets fired from her job and now is ready to leave on the next train, but in that one second that she has to decide whether to take the train or not to, she chooses not to. From then the film follows.

The film is Saroj Entertainment Pvt Ltd first home production.

Cast
Jackie Shroff as Yuvraaj Sanghi
Manisha Koirala as Raashi
Moammar Rana as Shantanu Roy
Nikita Anand as Tamanna
Rozza Catalona as Rozza

Soundtrack
"Hota Hai Har Faisala Ek Second Mein" - sung by Adnan Sami with female background vocals and English lyrics penned and sung by Shashika Mooruth.
"Hota Hai Har Faisala Ek Second Mein" - Remix sung by Adnan Sami with female background vocals and English lyrics penned and sung by Shashika Mooruth.
"Kyon Maang Yeh Khali Hai" — Alka Yagnik and Shaan
"Roza Roza" – Alisha Chinai and Anand Raj Anand

References

External links 

2010 films
Indian remakes of British films
2010s Hindi-language films
Films scored by Anand Raj Anand
Films directed by Partho Ghosh